This is a list of programs currently, formerly, and soon to be broadcast by Middle East Television (METV).

Currently broadcast by METV
 Another Life
 The 700 Club
 The Flying House
 NFL football
 Superbook
 New Beginnings
Duck Dynasty
The Rifleman
Gunsmoke
Touched by an Angel

Formerly broadcast by METV

Cartoons
 The Adventures of Don Coyote and Sancho Panda
 The Adventures of Tintin
 Alfred J. Kwak
 Alvin & the Chipmunks
 Around the World with Willy Fog
 The Atom Ant/Secret Squirrel Show
 Blaze and the Monster Machines
 Bionic Six
 Blake and Mortimer
 The Busy World of Richard Scarry
 Captain Caveman and the Teen Angels
 The Care Bears
 Danger Mouse
 Dennis the Menace
 Diplodos
 Fables of the Green Forest
 Fat Albert and the Cosby Kids
 The Flintstones
 The Get Along Gang
 GoldRake
 Harlem Globetrotters
 The Incredible Hulk
 Inspector Gadget
 The Jetsons
 JOT
 Laurel and Hardy
 Little Audrey
 Mighty Mouse
 Mort and Phil
 Muppet Babies
 The New Adventures Of Gilligan
 The All New Popeye Hour
 The New Three Stooges
 Captain Red Beard
 The Rocky and Bullwinkle Show
 Scooby-Doo, Where Are You!
 Snagglepuss
 Sonic the Hedgehog
 Spider-Man
 Spider-Man and His Amazing Friends
 Spider-Woman
 Spiral Zone
 The Super Globetrotters
 Superbook
 SuperTed
 Swiss Family Robinson
 Tom and Jerry
 Top Cat
 Touché Turtle and Dum Dum
 Wacky Races
 Wish Kid
 Woody Woodpecker
 Yogi Bear

Children's shows
 Animals, Animals, Animals
 Beakman's World
 Fraggle Rock
 Gerbert
 Gina D's Kids Club
 The Gospel Bill Show
 McGee and Me!
 Poppets Town
VeggieTales
 Wishbone
 Worzel Gummidge

TV series
 21 Jump Street
 The A-Team
 Airwolf
Another Life
 Battlestar Galactica  (1978)
 Bonanza
 Bordertown
 Buck Rogers in the 25th Century
 Cagney & Lacey
 The Campbells
 C.A.T.S. Eyes
 Code 3
 The Commish
 Death Valley Days
 The Equalizer
 The Fall Guy
 Father Murphy 
 Galactica 1980
 The Greatest American Hero
 Gunsmoke
 Hardcastle and McCormick
 Hart to Hart
 Hawaii Five-O
 The High Chaparral
 Highway to Heaven
 Hunter
 I Spy
 If Tomorrow Comes
 Jake and the Fatman
 Lassie
 Law & Order
 Little House on the Prairie
 The Lone Ranger
 Lost in Space
 Magnum, P.I.
 Matlock
 Moon Over Miami
 Moonlighting
 Murder, She Wrote
 The Paper Chase
 Patrol Boat
 Quantum Leap
 Outlaws
 Remington Steele
 Riptide
 The Roy Rogers Show
 Scarecrow and Mrs. King
 SeaQuest DSV
 Simon & Simon
 Star Trek: The Original Series
 Star Trek: The Next Generation
 Touched by an Angel
 Tour of Duty
 Trapper John, M.D.
 Walker, Texas Ranger
 The Waltons
 Wiseguy
 The Young Riders
 Zorro

Sitcoms
 The Andy Griffith Show
 The Beverly Hillbillies
 The Bob Morrison Show
 The Bob Newhart Show
 Boy Meets World
 Coach
 Cosby
 The Cosby Show
 Day by Day
 The Dick Van Dyke Show
 Doc
 F Troop
 The Facts of Life
 Family Ties
 Full House
 Gilligan's Island
 The Golden Girls
 Happy Days
Home Improvement
 I Dream of Jeannie
 The Jeffersons
 Kate & Allie
 Laverne & Shirley
 The Lucy Show
 Major Dad
 Marblehead Manor
 Martin
 The Mary Tyler Moore Show
 M*A*S*H
 Moesha
 Mork & Mindy
 Newhart
 The Odd Couple
 Perfect Strangers
 Punky Brewster
 The Red Green Show
 Remington Steele
 Saved by the Bell
 Webster
 Welcome Back, Kotter
 Wings
 WKRP in Cincinnati

Entertainment shows
 Amazing Discoveries with Mike Levey
 America's Funniest Home Videos
 The Muppet Show

Sports
 WWF

Religion
 The 700 Club
 Hour of Power
 Shape Up with Nancy Larson
 The Harvest Show
 Don't Ask Me, Ask God

Documentary
 Rescue 911

News
 60 Minutes
 World News Tonight from the Middle East News Center

Cypriot television shows
Programs broadcast by Middle East Television
Middle East Television
Middle East Television